Sarocalamus is a genus of Asian bamboo in the grass family.

Species
 Sarocalamus faberi (Rendle) Stapleton – Sichuan, Yunnan, Guizhou
 Sarocalamus racemosus (Munro) Stapleton – Tibet, Assam, Arunachal Pradesh, Myanmar, Bhutan, Sikkim, Nepal
 Sarocalamus spanostachyus (T.P.Yi) Stapleton – Sichuan

References

Bambusoideae
Bambusoideae genera